Felix Zymalkowski (13 August 1913 – 17 August 2004) was a German Schnellboot commander in World War II, recipient of the Knight's Cross of the Iron Cross and since 1963 professor of pharmaceutical chemistry. The Knight's Cross of the Iron Cross was awarded to recognise extreme battlefield bravery or successful military leadership.

Zymalkowski was a student of Karl Wilhelm Rosenmund at the University of Kiel. He achieved his habilitation in 1955 before he was called to the University of Bonn in 1963.

On 27 November 1944 Zymalkowski married Barbara Zimmermann. The marriage produced two daughters, Katharina born 1946 and Brigitte born 1948.

Awards
Offizierkreuz des Spanisch-Marokkanischen Mehdauia-Ordens (5 November 1937)
Wehrmacht Long Service Award 4th Class (1 April 1938)
Spanish Cross in Bronze without Swords (6 June 1939)
Marokko-Kalif-Majedi-Orden (6 July 1939)
Memel Medal (26 October 1939)
Sudetenland Medal (20 December 1939)
Iron Cross (1939)
2nd Class (14 April 1940)
1st Class (6 March 1942)
Fast Attack Craft War Badge (22 April 1941)
High Seas Fleet Badge (22 July 1941)
German Cross in Gold on 27 December 1943 as Korvettenkapitän in the 8. Schnellbootflottille
Knight's Cross of the Iron Cross (5 July 1943) as chief of the 8. Schnellbootflottille
Order of the Cross of Liberty IV. Klasse (20 February 1942)

References

Citations

Bibliography

 
 
 
 

1913 births
2004 deaths
People from the Province of Brandenburg
German military personnel of the Spanish Civil War
Recipients of the Gold German Cross
Recipients of the Knight's Cross of the Iron Cross
Kriegsmarine personnel
German prisoners of war in World War II held by the United Kingdom
University of Kiel alumni
Academic staff of the University of Bonn
Reichsmarine personnel
Military personnel from Berlin
People from Treptow-Köpenick